The Administrator of the Northern Territory is an official appointed by the Governor-General of Australia to represent the government of the Commonwealth in the Northern Territory, Australia. They perform functions similar to those of a state governor.

Strictly speaking, the appointment of an Administrator is made by the Governor-General-in-Council, that is, the Governor-General acting on the advice of the Commonwealth Government, rather than the advice of the Government of the Northern Territory. The Northern Territory received self-government on 1 July 1978, in accordance with the provisions of the Northern Territory (Self-Government) Act 1978 (Cth). Since then, the practice has arisen that in making an appointment the Governor-General-in-Council will act on the recommendation of the Northern Territory Government.

Unlike an Australian State Governor, the Administrator is not the direct representative of the King in the Territory but is instead appointed by the King's representative in the Commonwealth, the Governor-General, to administer the Territory in accordance with the Act. In practice, however, the Administrator performs a similar constitutional role to that of a state governor and can be considered the King's indirect representative in the Territory. This is light of the fact that territories are not sovereign in the same way as states, there being no 'Crown in right of the Northern Territory'.

The Administrator formally appoints the Chief Minister of the Northern Territory and the members of the Cabinet after every election. In all but a few cases, they are required by convention to act on the Cabinet's advice. The Administrator gives royal assent to all bills passed by the Northern Territory Legislative Assembly. Although the Governor-General (in practice, the Commonwealth Government) has the power to veto any territorial bill, in practice this right is almost never exercised.

The office of the Deputy of the Administrator was created in 1997.

In 2014, the Governor-General granted current, future and living former Administrators the title of 'The Honourable' for life, following the lead of Governors-General and Governors of New South Wales in granting the title.

The present Administrator is Hugh Heggie.

Crest of Administrator
The crest of Administrator of the Northern Territory which is similar to the one used by the Governor-General of Australia except that the flower below the St Edward's Crown is the Sturt Desert Rose which is the floral emblem of the Northern Territory.

South Australia (1863 to 1912) 
On 6 July 1863, land now known as the Northern Territory was annexed to the Colony of South Australia. Legislation regulating the sale of land in the Northern Territory which was given assent on 12 November 1863 included provision for both the appointment of a Government Resident and a description of the powers of this office.

Commonwealth of Australia (1912 to present) 

Administrators and Government Residents of the Northern Territory
after transfer of control to the Commonwealth Government:

Administrator (1912 to 1919)

Director (1919 to 1921)

Administrator (1921 to 1927)

Government Resident (1927 to 1931) 

From 1926 to 1931, the Northern Territory was divided into the territories of Central Australia and North Australia, with the border at the 20th parallel south. Each territory was administered by a Government Resident located respectively in Alice Springs (then known as Stuart) and in Darwin. 
Both territories were reincorporated as the Northern Territory in 1931.

Administrator (1931 to present)

Deputy of the Administrator (1997 to present) 

The office of the Deputy of the Administrator was established in 1997.

See also 

 Government House, Darwin
 Governors of the Australian states
 Darwin Rebellion
 Officer administering the government

References

External links 
 Office of the Administrator – official site

 
Northern Territory
Parliament of the Northern Territory